The iMac M1 is an all-in-one desktop Mac made by Apple Inc. It is the first iMac with Apple silicon, and sports a new, more colorful design, a 24-inch screen, and an Apple M1 chip. It was released on May 21, 2021, replacing the 21-inch and 27-inch Intel iMacs.

Overview 
On June 22, 2020, Apple CEO Tim Cook announced the Mac would shift from Intel processors to Apple's own in-house designed processors that use the ARM64 architecture, branded as Apple silicon. On April 20, 2021, Apple announced a 24-inch iMac based on the Apple M1 system on a chip.

The iMac with M1 features a 4480-by-2520 (4.5K) built-in display, 1080p FaceTime camera with an improved image signal processor and three-microphone array, and a six-driver stereo speaker system with a pair of force-canceling woofers and a tweeter per side, that supports Dolby Atmos and spatial audio. It also adds support for Wi-Fi 6, USB4/Thunderbolt 3, and 6K output to run the Pro Display XDR. External display support is reduced to one display over USB-C/Thunderbolt; the previous 21.5-inch Intel-based model could drive two 4K displays over USB-C/Thunderbolt. The models also include a magnetic power plug and external power supply that can be configured with a Gigabit Ethernet port. On previous iMac models, the power brick was internal to the iMac. The M1 iMac's power cable is braided, and color-matched with the iMac.

The iMac with M1 ships with a Magic Mouse 2 or Magic Trackpad 2 with a color-matching aluminum underside. It can be configured with one of three updated Magic Keyboards with rounded corners: a standard version, a version with a Touch ID sensor, and an extended layout version with a numeric keypad and Touch ID. The Magic Keyboards with Touch ID are compatible with other Mac computers with Apple silicon but only ship with the iMac.

Bloomberg's Mark Gurman reported that Apple was planning to skip making an iMac M2, and instead release an iMac M3 in the second half of 2023.

Design 
The iMac with M1 is the first iMac with a major redesign since 2012, with slimmer bezels, a flat back and seven color options; they are the same colors used in Apple's first official logo. It is the first iMac available in multiple colors since the iMac G3. Jony Ive contributed to its design.

Reception 
CNET's Katie Collins said the design was a statement piece that served as a "symbol of hope" while working from home during the COVID-19 pandemic; and also considered this to be part of an anti-minimalism trend, an end to "austerity" in product design. Technology blogger John Gruber called it elegant and cheerful, and complimented its display, speaker quality, performance, and the addition of Touch ID to the keyboard. The Verge's Monica Chin called the M1 iMac "simple, attractive, and very functional", concluding that it has "arguably the most widespread consumer appeal of any [recent] iMac"; she also found that the machine achieved higher single-core Geekbench performance scores "than any Mac we’ve ever seen before — even the iMac Pro".

The M1 iMac has a low repairability score of just 2 out of 10.

Specifications

Timeline of iMac models

References

External links 
 

IMac family
Macintosh all-in-ones
Computer-related introductions in 2021
ARM Macintosh computers